Why Is It So? is an educational science series produced in Australia by ABC Television from 1963 to 1986. The series was hosted by American scientist Julius Sumner Miller, who demonstrated experiments in the world of physics. The series was also screened in the United States, Canada, New Zealand and in Europe.

This program was based on his 1959 series Why Is It So? in the United States on KNXT (now KCBS-TV) Channel 2 in Los Angeles.

References

External links 
 

1960s Australian documentary television series
1970s Australian documentary television series
1980s Australian documentary television series
Science education television series
Physics education
Australian Broadcasting Corporation original programming
1963 Australian television series debuts
1986 Australian television series endings